Priscus Attalus (Greek: Πρίσκος Άτταλος, died after 416) was twice Roman usurper (in 409–10 and in 414–15), against Emperor Honorius, with Visigothic support. Originally a pagan, he was eventually baptized as an Arian Christian, thus becoming the last pretender to the Roman imperial office who did not profess Nicene Christianity.

Biography
Priscus Attalus was a Greek from the Roman province of Asia, whose father had moved to Italy under Valentinian I. Attalus was an important senator in Rome, who served as praefectus urbi in 409. He was twice proclaimed emperor by the Visigoths, in an effort to impose their terms on the ineffectual Emperor Honorius, in Ravenna.

He held the title of Emperor in Rome for a few months 409–410, and later in Burdigala again for a few months in 414–415. The first reign ended when Alaric believed it was hampering his negotiations with Honorius, and the second ended after he was abandoned by the Visigoths and eventually captured by Honorius's men. Attalus was obliged to participate in the triumph Honorius celebrated in the streets of Rome in 416, before finishing his days exiled in the Aeolian Islands.

See also
 Ancient Rome: The Rise and Fall of an Empire
 List of Roman usurpers

References 

 Elton, Hugh, "Attalus (409-410, 414-415 A.D.)", De Imperatoribus Romanis

5th-century deaths
5th-century Roman usurpers
Ancient Greeks in Rome
Ancient Roman exiles
Late-Roman-era pagans
Roman emperors
Urban prefects of Rome
Year of birth unknown